Coyote Trails is a 1935 American Western film produced and directed by Bernard B. Ray starring Tom Tyler. There are no coyotes or their trails featured in the film.

Plot 
A ranch is having their horses disappear with it believed that a wild white stallion called "The Phantom" is luring them away. In reality The Phantom is being used by rustlers in cahoots with the ranch's foreman.

Cast 
Tom Tyler as Tom Riley
Ben Corbett as Sidekick Windy
Alice Dahl as Helen Baker
Lafe McKee as John Baker
Richard Alexander as Mack Larkin
Slim Whitaker as Bert
George Chesebro as Henchman Jim

External links 

1935 films
American Western (genre) films
American romance films
American adventure films
1930s English-language films
American black-and-white films
1935 Western (genre) films
1930s romance films
1935 adventure films
Films directed by Bernard B. Ray
Reliable Pictures films
1930s American films